Pas de Peyrol (el. 1,589 m) is a mountain pass located in Auvergne, France, and is the highest road pass in the Massif Central. The pass is on the slopes of  Puy Mary (1,787 m) and is situated at the junction of three roads:

 D17 to the south-west towards Aurillac, via the Col de Redondet (1,531 m), then down the valley of the River Jordanne.
 D680 to the north-west towards Salers
 D680 to the east, towards Dienne, down the valley of the River Santoire

Tour de France
The pass is regularly used on the Tour de France, most recently in the 2020 tour. The pass was first used in the 1959 Tour de France, on the 231 km stage 14 from Aurillac to Clermont Ferrand, with Louis Bergaud first across the summit. In the 2004 tour, the pass was used on stage 10 from Limoges to Saint-Flour, approaching from the Salers direction which includes a final three kilometres at an average of 12% and a maximum gradient of 15%, with Richard Virenque first over the summit. The same ascent was used as the finish of stage 13 in the 2020 Tour de France, which was won by Daniel Martínez.

Appearances in the Tour de France  
The Tour de France has crossed or finished at the summit 11 times since 1947. The 10th stage of the 2004 tour was selected for the 2004 L'Étape du Tour, in which amateur and club riders ride over a full stage of the tour.

See also
 List of highest paved roads in Europe
 List of mountain passes

External links
 Le Pas de Peyrol ou (Puy-Mary) dans le Tour de France 
 Climb profile from Dienne (2008 Tour de France route)

Landforms of Cantal
Transport in Auvergne-Rhône-Alpes
Mountain passes of Auvergne-Rhône-Alpes
Mountain passes of the Massif Central